Devaki Vijayaraman (born c.1992) is an Indian home baker, television cook and a business owner, who hails from the town Trichy. She was the winner of MasterChef India – Tamil (season 1).

Vijayaraman plans to use her prize on 25 lakh to extend her training. She plans include having a restaurant featuring South Indian style dishes and desserts.

Early life
Devaki was born in Trichy, Tamil Nadu in 1992. During her secondary school life Devaki always wanted to become a chef and study catering technology and open up her small bakery. But unfortunately her parents did not agree to that and she started her studies in B.Com and graduated from that field from Cauvery College for Women which is located in Chennai.

She later quit her B.Com job and started up a small baking business which became successful and Devaki found a her major interest in cooking and baking then.

She later married a man from Madurai named Gokulnath Vijayakumar and later the couple had a son together.

MasterChef India - Tamil 
Devaki was selected in the Top 14 to contest MasterChef India - Tamil in 2021. She reached the finale on 14 November, which she won 54 points out of 60. Which was the highest points ever received on the show up to date.

She is also the first person to win MasterChef India - Tamil.

After MasterChef
Vijayaraman is currently planning to open up her very own YouTube channel to provide information and recipes of various different dishes she made.And She committed for a movie. She also opened up a small baking business under the name of Brown Sugar By Devaki Vijayaraman which is located in the heart of Puthur, Tiruchirappalli.

Filmography

Films

References

External links

1990s births
Living people
People from Tiruchirappalli
MasterChef India
Participants in Indian reality television series
Reality cooking competition winners
Ethiraj College for Women alumni